Enrique "Kike" Burgos Carrasco (born 20 January 1971) is a Spanish former footballer who played as a goalkeeper.

Club career
Born in Barakaldo, Basque Country, Burgos was a youth product of local giants Athletic Bilbao. He played 317 games in Segunda División over the course of nine seasons, with Polideportivo Ejido (five years), Bilbao Athletic and RCD Mallorca (two apiece). 
 
Burgos retired in June 2007, at the age of 36. He later worked as assistant at Villarreal CF and Real Murcia under Julio Velázquez, being goalkeeper coach at Real Betis with the same manager but dismissed after a quarrel with Antonio Adán.

References

External links

1971 births
Living people
Spanish footballers
Footballers from Barakaldo
Association football goalkeepers
La Liga players
Segunda División players
Bilbao Athletic footballers
Athletic Bilbao footballers
RCD Mallorca players
Deportivo Alavés players
Polideportivo Ejido footballers
Spain youth international footballers
Spain under-21 international footballers
Spain under-23 international footballers
Villarreal CF non-playing staff